The College of the Florida Keys (CFK), formerly Florida Keys Community College, is a public community college in Key West, Florida. It is part of the Florida College System. Its main campus is on Stock Island, adjacent to the only living coral reef in North America. CFK also operates two additional locations in the Florida Keys; one in Marathon and another in Key Largo.  With its Key West location, CFK is the southernmost post-secondary school of any type within the contiguous United States.

CFK offers two-year associate degrees in various programs and associate degrees for students planning to transfer to four-year institutions.  CFK offers an array of bachelor's and associate degrees, certificates, and career training programs to suit a variety of academic and professional goals CFK also operates the Tennessee Williams Fine Arts Center, named for the famed playwright who lived in Key West. , CFK had graduated over 1,000 nurses. Among CFK's unique degree programs (based on the needs of the Key West area) are Marine Technology, Marine Environmental Technology, and Diving Business & Technology. The college also offers Licensing programs for professional mariners.  

Florida Keys Community College was renamed to The College of the Florida Keys, after passing both the Florida House and Senate, and signed into law on June 7, 2019.

References

External links 
 

1965 establishments in Florida
Educational institutions established in 1965
Florida College System
Universities and colleges accredited by the Southern Association of Colleges and Schools
Education in Monroe County, Florida